Kenneth Morris is the name of:

 Kenneth Morris (author) (1879–1937), Welsh author and theosophist
 Kenneth Morris (politician) (1903–1978), Australian politician
 Kenny Morris (musician) (born 1957), drummer with Siouxsie and the Banshees
 Kenny Morris (EastEnders), fictional character
 Kenneth Morris (composer) (1917–1988), African American gospel composer

See also 
 Ken Morris (born 1942), American Olympic bobsledder